Djahnine is a surname. Notable people with the surname include: 

Farid Djahnine (born 1976), Algerian footballer
Habiba Djahnine (born 1968), Algerian film producer